Anton Aleksandrovich Shagin (born 2 April 1984) is a Russian actor of theater, most famous for his role as Mels in Hipsters.

Biography
Anton Gorshkov (Shagin) was born in Kimry, Kalinin Oblast, Russian SFSR, Soviet Union. 
He spent his childhood in Karachev, Bryansk Oblast. 

Before attending school, he bore the name of Anton Gorshkov (Shagin - the surname of his stepfather). When Anton was 14 years old, his mother died. After 9th grade he went to study at a vocational school to be a locksmith. He participated in the initiative. After graduating from vocational school, he worked for one year, went to Moscow to enroll in the Moscow Art Theater School. He entered the first time.

In 2006, he graduated from the Moscow Art Theatre School (course of I. Zolotovitsky and S. Zemtsov).

Winner of the Theatre Award "Golden Leaf" in 2006 for Best Actor in the play Do not part with your beloved in the Moscow Art Theater School.

Since the 2022 Russian invasion of Ukraine, Anton has played an active role in promoting the Russian narrative of the Russo-Ukrainian War on state media. He has been featured in interviews on the Russia-1 program Life and Destiny, where he emotionally describes atrocities by the Ukrainian government he claims to have witnessed against ethnic Russians while traveling in Donbass.

Personal life
He is married to classmate Veronika Isayeva. Their children are son Matvey (b. 2008), and daughter Polina (b. 2014).

Roles in theater
Lenkom Theatre
  2009 "The Cherry Orchard" by Anton Chekhov; director Mark Zakharov - Lopakhin
  2011 "Peer Gynt" by Ibsen; director Mark Zakharov - Peer Gynt

Moscow Art Theatre Chekhov
  "Do not part with your beloved" Volodin - Mitya

Russian Academic Youth Theatre
  "The Red and the Black" by Stendhal; director Yuri Eremin - Male
  "The Coast of Utopia" T. Stoppard; director Alexander Borodin - Sleptsov

Other theaters
  "Valentine's Day". Director: Victor Ryzhakov - Valentin (TC Strastnoy)
  "July". Director: Victor Ryzhakov - the role of three sons of a maniac (Theater "Practice")
  "Love of the Stanislavsky system." Director: Mikheil Kazakov - Alex (youngest son) (PM Innovation)
  "Liturgy ZERO» Director: Valery Fokin - the role of Alexei Ivanovich (Alexandrinsky Theater in St. Petersburg)

Filmography

Film

References

Zero Liturgy accessed March 27, 2014

External links 
 

1984 births
Living people
People from Kimry
Russian male film actors
Russian male television actors
Russian male stage actors
Male actors from Moscow
21st-century Russian male actors
Moscow Art Theatre School alumni